Fred Webster (19 April 1935 – 17 December 2012) was an Australian rules footballer who played for Melbourne in the Victorian Football League (VFL).

Webster made three appearances in the 1955 VFL season, after making his debut in a win over Geelong on the Melbourne Cricket Ground. His two other games were against Footscray.

The following season, Webster joined Sandringham in the Victorian Football Association, with whom he played until 1963. He was club captain from 1959, won the club's best and fairest award in 1961, and led Sandringham to their 1962 premiership. They came from 44 points down in the Grand Final to win by a point.

References

Australian Football: Zebras Back From The Brink
Holmesby, Russell and Main, Jim (2007). The Encyclopedia of AFL Footballers. 7th ed. Melbourne: Bas Publishing.

1935 births
2012 deaths
Melbourne Football Club players
Sandringham Football Club players
Australian players of Australian rules football